The SPAD S.54 was a French biplane trainer aircraft of the early 1920s, developed by Société Pour L'Aviation et ses Dérivés (SPAD).

Specifications

References

S.54
Aircraft first flown in 1922
Biplanes
Single-engined tractor aircraft
Rotary-engined aircraft